The Way It Is may refer to:

Music 
 The Way It Is (Bruce Hornsby album), by Bruce Hornsby and the Range
 "The Way It Is" (song), the title song
 The Way It Is (Glenn Hughes album), or the title song
 The Way It Is (John Williamson album), 1999
 The Way It Is (Keyshia Cole album), 2005
 The Way It Is (Snowy White album), or the title song
 The Way It Is, a 2000 album by Madasun
 "The Way It Is", a song by The Strokes from album Room on Fire
 "The Way It Is", a song by Simon Townshend from album Among Us
 "The Way It Is", a song by The Sheepdogs from their self-titled album, The Sheepdogs
 "The Way It Is", a song by Nicole Atkins from her album Neptune City
 "The Way It Is", a song by Tesla from their album The Great Radio Controversy
 "The Way It Is", a song by Emily Williams released as a single

Other uses 
 Keyshia Cole: The Way It Is, a 2006–2008 American reality TV series
 The Way It Is (TV series), a Canadian TV newsmagazine show of the 1960s
 The Way It Is (film), a 1985 American film
 The Way It Is (programme), a 1998–2001 British satirical radio series
 The Way It Is: New and Selected Poems, a 1999 posthumous collection by William Stafford

See also 
 That's the Way It Is (disambiguation)